Walter Frederick Keeble (30 August 1919 – 8 May 1987) was an English professional footballer who played as an inside forward.

References

1919 births
1987 deaths
Footballers from Coventry
English footballers
Association football inside forwards
Coventry City F.C. players
Albion Rovers F.C. players
Grimsby Town F.C. players
Notts County F.C. players
English Football League players